O Movimento Brasileiro de Alfabetização (The Brazilian Moviment of Literation), better known as MOBRAL, was one of the projects created by the Brazilian government, by the Law 5.379, on 15 December 1967, and proposed to literate of youths and adults, with a vision of "conducting the human person to acquire techniques of reading, writing and calculation, as a way of integration in its community, allowing better life conditions".

Educational organisations based in Brazil